Dorymyrmex emmaericaellus is a species of ant in the genus Dorymyrmex. Described by Kusnezov in 1951, the species is endemic to Bolivia.

References

Dorymyrmex
Hymenoptera of South America
Insects described in 1951